The Guadarrama is a river in Spain.

Course
The Guadarrama flows from north to south for  through the autonomous community of Castilla-La Mancha and the Province of Toledo, where it empties into the Tagus.

Its middle course is a protected area within the Regional Park of the Middle Course of the Guadarrama River and Its Surroundings, which is one of the three regional parks within the Community of Madrid.  The basin area is about   Its main tributary is the Aulencia River, which flows entirely within the Community of Madrid and supplies water to the reservoir of Valmayor.

References

External links
 

Rivers of Spain
Rivers of the Community of Madrid
Rivers of Castilla–La Mancha
Tributaries of the Tagus